Karen Courtland Kelly (born October 12, 1970, in Orange, New Jersey) is a former American pair skater. With partner Todd Reynolds, she won the bronze medal at the United States Figure Skating Championships in 1993 and 1994 and finished 14th at the 1994 Winter Olympic Games.  Karen Courtland and Todd Reynolds were coached by Olympic Bronze Medalist, Ronald Ludington at the University of Delaware Ice Skating Science Development Center in Newark, Delaware.

In 1995, Courtland married Olympic Speed Skater Patrick Kelly. She is the first female Olympian to teach skating artists the sport of Figures & Fancy Skating in Lake Placid, New York.  She has trained many skaters to represent their country in the World Figure & Fancy Skating Championships on black ice. From 1996 - 2002, Courtland fulfilled a contract between Peak Edge Performance and the Olympic Regional Development Authority, to be a spokesperson and director to revamp Lake Placid’s outdated Figure Skating Program where she also produced twelve full-scale ice show productions with legendary skating champions including Dorothy Hamill, Brian Orser, Oleg & Ludmila Protopopov, Alexei Yagudin, Tara Lapinski, Donald Jackson, Surya Bonaly and many others.  She also trained figure skaters in the fundamental figures (previously known as the insignificant terms compulsory/school), free style, pairs, dance, free dance, and moves to children and adults.  She is also a motivational speaker and pilates teacher.  Courtland is the president of the World Figure Sport Society and the Chef de Mission of Education and Sport for the World Figure & Fancy Skating Championships & Festival on black ice.  She choreographs and performs professionally as a World Class Skating Artist in Singles, Pairs, and Dance.  Courtland was inducted into the New Jersey Figure Skating Foundation Hall of Fame in 2014 and World Figure Sport’s Skating Hall of Fame in 2015.  She is an honorary member of the University of Delaware Figure Skating Club.

Results

With Davenport

With Dungjen

With Reynolds

References 

1970 births
American female pair skaters
Olympic figure skaters of the United States
Figure skaters at the 1994 Winter Olympics
Living people
21st-century American women
20th-century American women